Viktorija Magaļinskaja (born 12 July 1992) is a Lithuanian footballer who plays as a goalkeeper for MFK Žalgiris. She has been a member of the Lithuania women's national team.

References

1992 births
Living people
Women's association football goalkeepers
Lithuanian women's footballers
Lithuania women's international footballers